Delattre or de Lattre is a surname, and may refer to:

 Adolphe Delattre, French ornithologist
 Alfred Louis Delattre, French archaeologist
 Bernard de Lattre de Tassigny, French army officer
 Jean de Lattre de Tassigny, French army general
 Marie Delattre

French-language surnames